Christian Hørby (born 17 March 2001) is a Danish professional footballer, who plays as a midfielder for Thisted FC.

Club career

Hobro IK
In the summer 2019, Hørby left Randers FC and went on a trial at Hobro IK and played in a game for the clubs reserve team, which earned him a spot on the Hobro's U19 squad.

On 5 July 2020, Hørby got his official debut for Hobro in the Danish Superliga against his former club Randers FC. Hørby started on the bench, but replaced Edgar Babayan in the 60th minute.

Thisted
On 20 August 2021, Hørby joined Thisted FC.

References

External links
 

2001 births
Living people
Danish men's footballers
Association football midfielders
Danish Superliga players
Danish 1st Division players
Danish 2nd Division players
Randers FC players
Hobro IK players
Thisted FC players